Sheikh Rashid bin Humaid Al Nuaimi, (1902  6 September 1981) was the 9th Ruler of Ajman and ruled the emirate from 1928 until 1981. Throughout his 53 years as Ruler, he worked  to build Ajman. He was one of the founding fathers of the United Arab Emirates.

He is the father of the current Ruler, Sheikh Humaid bin Rashid Al Nuaimi III.

The ruling family belongs to the Al Na'im tribe.

He established the Ajman Police in 1967.

Children
 Ali bin Rashid Al Nuaimi (died July 1990)
 Fatima bint Rashid Al Nuaimi (died 14 December 2014)
Humaid bin Rashid Al Nuaimi III
 Abdulla bin Rashid Al Nuaimi (died 12 January 2013)
 Nasser bin Rashid Al Nuaimi
 Nayla bint Rashid Al Nuaimi
 Shaikha bint Rashid Al Nuaimi
 Saeed bin Rashid Al Nuaimi
 Abdulaziz bin Rashid Al Nuaimi
 Saqr bin Rashid Al Nuaimi
 Hamdan bin Rashid Al Nuaimi
 Sultan bin Rashid Al Nuaimi
 Mohammed bin Rashid Al Nuaimi
 Ahmed bin Rashid Al Nuaimi
 Maryam bint Rashid Al Nuaimi

See also
 Royal families of the United Arab Emirates

References

1902 births
1981 deaths
Sheikhs of the Emirate of Ajman
History of the United Arab Emirates
20th-century Emirati people